Edward W. Weld (February 20, 1937 — November 19, 2006) was an American professional tennis player.

Weld, a Massachusetts native, captained Harvard University in varsity tennis. He twice featured in the singles second round of the US Open. A stockbroker by profession, he was consistently the number one ranked player in New England and served multiple terms as president of the New England Lawn Tennis Association.

References

External links
 
 

1937 births
2006 deaths
American male tennis players
Harvard Crimson men's tennis players
Tennis people from Massachusetts